Mount Darwin (alternate: Darwin) is one of seven districts in the Mashonaland Central province of Zimbabwe. The district's capital is the town of Mount Darwin(Pfura).

References

Districts of Mashonaland Central Province